The 12345 /12346 Saraighat Express is a daily Superfast train which runs between Howrah, Kolkata (West Bengal) and  (Assam), via  in Siliguri, North Bengal. It is one of the premium trains that connects Kolkata to the north east, and is often given highest priority in its route. 

COACH COMPOSITION:

1 AC First cum AC II tier
1 AC II tier
3 AC III tier
12 Sleeper class
5 General Unreserved
1 Pantry car
1 Luggage cum Guard Van

Timing

 12346 – leaves Guwahati daily at 12:20 pm IST and reaches Howrah Junction the next morning 5:20 am IST
 12345 – leaves Howrah Junction daily at 3:50 pm IST and reaches Guwahati the next morning 10:05 am IST

Traction

From  to  it is now hauled by Electric Loco Shed, Howrah-based WAP-7 electric locomotive & vice versa.

Time Table

References

External links
Saraighat Express India Rail Info
Saraighat SF Special India Rail Info

Rail transport in Howrah
Transport in Guwahati
Rail transport in West Bengal
Rail transport in Assam
Express trains in India
Named passenger trains of India